West Ambae (also known as Duidui, the principal dialect, and Opa, the Mota name for the island) is an Oceanic language spoken on Ambae, Vanuatu. Recognized dialects of West Ambae include Walaha and Nduindui (Duindui). The New Testament was published in West Ambae in 1984.

References

External links
A Halagi Huri Lai A Sacrament Laqa Na Tanaloi u Lena Anglican Holy Communion Prayers in Nduindui (1965), digitized by Richard Mammana and Charles Wohlers
Hala Na Tataro Tana Tataro Ginia Lolo Imada Simplified Anglican Morning and Evening Prayer (1965), digitized by Richard Mammana

Penama languages
Languages of Vanuatu